An extrasolar object is an astronomical object that exists outside the Solar System. It is not applied to stars, or any other celestial object that is larger than a star or the Solar System, such as a galaxy. The terms for extrasolar examples of Solar System bodies are:

 Extrasolar planet, also called an "exoplanet"
 Extrasolar moon, also called an  "exomoon"
 Exocomet, an extrasolar comet
 Extrasolar asteroid, with one identified as of 2013, orbiting GD 61

Some Solar System object classes, such as minor planets, dwarf planets and Trans-Neptunian objects have not been detected outside the Solar System.

See also
 Extraterrestrial, referring to objects or phenomena existing within the Solar System, but not on Earth
 Extragalactic astronomy, the study of objects outside the Milky Way Galaxy
 Interstellar object, an object that has traveled through interstellar space, such as ʻOumuamua, the first known example
 Planetary system, a set of gravitationally bound non-stellar objects in orbit around a star or star system 

Astronomical nomenclature